Handball was contested at the 2001 Mediterranean Games in Tunis at Le Centre Medico-Sportif.

Medalists

Standings

Men's Competition

Women's Competition

References
 Complete 2001 Mediterranean Games Standings

Handball at the Mediterranean Games
Sports at the 2001 Mediterranean Games
International handball competitions hosted by Tunisia
2001 in Tunisian sport